Quechua may refer to:
Quechua people, several indigenous ethnic groups in South America, especially in Peru
Quechuan languages, a Native South American language family spoken primarily in the Andes, derived from a common ancestral language
Southern Quechua, the most widely spoken Quechua language, with about 6.9 million speakers 
North Bolivian Quechua, a dialect of Southern Quechua spoken in northern Bolivia 
South Bolivian Quechua, a dialect of Southern Quechua spoken in Bolivia and in northern Argentina

Other uses
Quechua (brand), a French sporting goods brand
Quechua (geography), a natural region of Peru
Quechua alphabet, orthography based on the Latin alphabet to write Quechua languages
Quechua Wikipedia, a language edition of Wikipedia

See also
Quecha (disambiguation)
Kʼicheʼ language
Qʼeqchiʼ language

Language and nationality disambiguation pages